Woodville School may refer to:
Woodville School (Wakefield, Massachusetts), listed on the NRHP in Massachusetts
Woodville School (Ordinary, Virginia), listed on the NRHP in Virginia